Vincent Alain Laurini (born 10 June 1989) is a French professional footballer who plays as a full-back.

Career
Laurini was born in Thionville, France, to parents from Italy. He was a player of Sedan.

In 2008, he left for Italian amateur club Fossombrone, where he won Eccellenza Marche and promoted. In 2010, he was signed by Carpi, winning group B of 2010–11 Lega Pro Seconda Divisione. In July 2011, he signed a new five-year contract. On 13 July 2012, he was sold to Serie B club Empoli in a co-ownership deal, wherein then he signed a four-year contract. He wore the number 2 shirt for his new club.

On 20 June 2013, the co-ownership was renewed.

On 8 July 2019, Laurini signed to Parma until 2022.

Honours
Carpi
 Lega Pro Seconda Divisione: 2011

Fossombrone
 Eccellenza Marche: 2009

References

External links
 Serie B profile 

French footballers
CS Sedan Ardennes players
A.C. Carpi players
Empoli F.C. players
ACF Fiorentina players
Parma Calcio 1913 players
Serie A players
Serie B players
Serie C players
Serie D players
Expatriate footballers in Italy
French expatriate sportspeople in Italy
Association football fullbacks
People from Thionville
1989 births
Living people
Sportspeople from Moselle (department)
French people of Italian descent
French expatriate footballers
Footballers from Grand Est